Burt's deer mouse (Peromyscus caniceps) is a species of rodent in the family Cricetidae. It is endemic to Mexico, where it is found only on Montserrat Island off the east coast of Baja California Sur. The species is threatened by predation by feral cats.

References

Peromyscus
Endemic mammals of Mexico
Fauna of Gulf of California islands
Endemic fauna of the Baja California Peninsula
Rodents of North America
Critically endangered biota of Mexico
Critically endangered fauna of North America
Mammals described in 1932
Taxonomy articles created by Polbot